Sunshine of My Soul: Live at the Keystone Korner is an album of a live solo performance by American jazz pianist Jaki Byard recorded in 1978 and released as a CD on the HighNote label in 2007.

Reception

AllMusic reviewer Thom Jurek states, "Byard was a true giant of jazz and this set, in excellent sound, displays all of the reasons". All About Jazz's George Kanzler noted "Byard was at his uninhibited best as a solo pianist and this CD unearths a sterling solo set recorded in 1978 at a San Francisco jazz club".

Track listing
All compositions by Jaki Byard except as indicated
 "Tribute to the Ticklers" - 3:46	
 "Charles Mingus Medley: Fables of Faubus/Peggy's Blue Skylight/So Long Eric" (Charles Mingus) ["So Long Eric" is not listed] - 6:27		
 "Hazy Eve" - 6:43
 "Spinning Wheel" (David Clayton-Thomas) - 4:15
 "Excerpts from Songs of Proverbs" - 6:44
 "Boogie Woogie In and Out" - 3:59
 "Emil" - 4:27
 "Bésame Mucho" (Consuelo Velázquez) - 8:37
 "Sunshine" - 5:15
 "Two Different Worlds" (Al Frisch, Sid Wayne) - 5:05
 "European Episodes" - 4:33

Personnel
Jaki Byard – piano

References

Jaki Byard live albums
HighNote Records live albums
2007 live albums
Albums recorded at Keystone Korner
Solo piano jazz albums